Edward Abraham Johnson (born March 31, 1984) is an American former soccer player. He played the majority of his fourteen-year club career in the U.S. with FC Dallas, Kansas City Wizards, Seattle Sounders FC, and D.C. United. Johnson also spent three and a half years with several European clubs.

Johnson also played for the United States men's national soccer team from 2004 to 2014, and was part of the U.S. squad for the 2006 FIFA World Cup. At the time of his retirement, Johnson ranked eighth on the list of goal-scorers with 19 goals for the U.S. national team.

Professional

Youth career
Johnson became one of the youngest players to sign with Major League Soccer, and was drafted by Dallas Burn as a Project-40 player in the second round of the 2001 MLS SuperDraft. In his first three years in the league, he did not get much playing time, and was very inconsistent when he did get on the field. Johnson scored just seven goals for Dallas in those seasons, while missing time with U.S. youth national teams.

In January 2005, Benfica offered what would have been an MLS-record $5 million transfer fee for Johnson, but Johnson and the league both rejected the offer.

In May 2005, Johnson suffered an injury to the toes of his right foot that sidelined him until August of that year. After returning to MLS in August – he scored only five goals during the season – Johnson re-injured his toes in mid-September and was sidelined until January 2006.

Kansas City Wizards
With Dallas in salary cap trouble, Johnson was traded to the Kansas City Wizards on February 14, 2006, for two allocations.
It was announced that Johnson would be training with Premier League club Reading during the MLS offseason, but he did not sign with the club.

In 2006 and early 2007, Johnson suffered a decline in form, scoring only twice in the 2006 MLS season and failing to make an impact with the national team. However, Johnson returned to form with the start of the 2007 MLS season, notching twelve goals and three assists in his first eleven games. On June 2, 2007, Johnson became the first player ever to score back to back hat-tricks in MLS play when he scored three goals against the New York Red Bulls, following a three-goal performance against the New England Revolution the previous week on May 26.

Premier League and Fulham

In July 2007, Johnson saw increased speculation over a transfer to the Premier League. Derby County had been most vocal, with Derby manager Billy Davies confirming that he would explore the U.S. market. However, after MLS accepted a $6 million bid from Derby, Johnson reportedly nixed the deal as he preferred to finish his season in Kansas City. Johnson revealed his contract is structured to give him final say over whether he is purchased by fifteen designated clubs. Johnson left the national team camp in California on January 17, 2008; he completed a transfer to Fulham on January 23, 2008, signing a contract extending until the summer of 2011.

Loan to Cardiff City

He joined Championship side Cardiff City on loan for the 2008–09 season in August, making his debut for the club during a 2–1 victory over Milton Keynes Dons in the Football League Cup. He went on to make his league debut four days later as an eighty-fifth-minute substitute in a 0–0 draw with Sheffield United. He struggled to recover his goal-scoring form that he showed during his time in MLS.

However, he regained some of his form as the season progressed, and had a breakthrough week when he scored his first goal in English soccer on March 7, 2009, in a 3–0 victory against Doncaster Rovers. Four days later Johnson was named man of the match for his performance in Cardiff's 3–1 victory over Barnsley. A month later, when Cardiff hosted Derby County, Johnson scored his second goal of the season and added an own goal during injury time as the Bluebirds rolled to a 4–1 victory. Johnson's goal for Cardiff also meant that he was the last Cardiff City goalscorer under the Ninian Park floodlights.

Johnson returned to Fulham from Cardiff City for the 2009–10 season. He featured in the majority of Fulham's pre-season fixtures, scoring in a friendly at Australian club Melbourne Victory, was on the bench for Fulham's 3–0 victory over Vetra in the first leg of the third round of the Europa League, and came on as a late substitute in and recorded an assist in Fulham's 3–0 win in the second leg against Vetra.

Greece and Loan to Aris
On December 31, 2009, Johnson joined Greek side Aris Thessaloniki on loan for the remainder of the 2009–10 season. On January 13, 2010, Johnson made his first appearance for Aris, coming on as a 79th-minute substitute in a 2–0 victory over Asteras Tripoli F.C. in the round of 16 of the Greek Cup. He made his Greek Super League debut, appearing as a second-half substitute against PAS Giannina F.C., on January 17, 2010. Johnson scored two goals in their playoff win over Olympiacos. Johnson scored five goals for Aris and was one of the top goalscorers in the Greek Super League Playoff with three goals.

Loan to Preston
On January 31, 2011, Johnson was sent out on loan to Championship club Preston North End. He scored his first goal against Reading a flicked on header from a curling Keith Treacy cross. The goal was later given as an own goal.

On December 22, 2011, it was announced that Johnson had signed with Primera División de Mexico club Puebla. However, Johnson never officially signed a contract with the team and was released from camp after training with the team three or four times due to a difference in opinions between the coach, Juan Carlos Osorio, and the team's technical staff.

Seattle Sounders FC
Johnson signed with MLS on February 17, 2012 and was selected on February 18, 2012 by Montreal Impact via allocation process. He was immediately traded to Seattle Sounders FC in exchange for Mike Fucito and Lamar Neagle. He scored his first two goals for the Sounders in games against the Chicago Fire and the LA Galaxy. He was selected to the 2012 MLS All Star Team by coach Ben Olsen, eventually scoring the game-winning goal against Chelsea in a 3-2 victory. During the 2012 season, Johnson was selected as MLS Player of the Week two times. The first time in week 22, following a one-goal performance in a 4-0 win over the Los Angeles Galaxy. He received the honor a second time in week 27, following his two-goal showing in a 2-1 comeback victory against Chivas USA.

Johnson led the Sounders in goals scored during the 2012 MLS season, netting 14 total and finishing sixth in the league's Golden Boot race. Of the 14 total goals scored by Johnson, 9 came from headers, which led all players in MLS.

For his quality performance throughout the season, Johnson was named "Comeback Player of the Year" in MLS for the 2012 season. MLS Commissioner Don Garber said of Johnson receiving the award: "Eddie Johnson had a great resurgence with Seattle. Eddie joined our league when he was 17 years old and had one of his best years with us at 28.  I still think he has a number of good years left in him." It was the second time Johnson received the award, previously winning in 2007 as a player with Kansas City.

Johnson scored the winning goal for the Sounders against Tigres de la UANL in the quarterfinal of the 2013 CONCACAF Champions League knockout stage. The 75th-minute goal put the Sounders ahead 3-2 on aggregate, and advanced the club to the semi-finals of the tournament. With the Sounders victory over Tigres, they became the first MLS side to eliminate a Mexican club in the history of the CONCACAF Champions League.

Towards the end of the 2013 MLS season, Johnson openly made pleas for an improved contract. Salary cap issues prevented Seattle from offering this, and so Johnson was cut from the team with the intention of his rights been traded.

D.C. United
Johnson was traded to D.C. United in exchange for allocation money on December 17, 2013.
On May 17, 2014, Johnson scored his first goal for D.C. United in the 84th minute against the Montreal Impact.
In March 2015, after an extended medical leave, it was reported that Johnson might need to retire due to a heart condition.   On November 1, 2015, Johnson formally announced his retirement due to a diagnosed heart ailment.

International

Johnson had success at the U-17 level, scoring 23 goals in 25 appearances and leading that team in scoring in both 2000 and 2001. This success continued at U-20 level, and in 2003 at the FIFA World Youth Championship in the United Arab Emirates he scored four goals, three from the penalty spot, and notched one assist to win the tournament's Golden Shoe as the top scorer.

Johnson received his first cap and scored his first goal for the senior United States team against El Salvador on October 9, 2004, becoming one of a small group of American players to get his first international goal in a World Cup qualifier. He then scored a hat-trick in his second appearance four days later, all within a seventeen-minute spree against Panama. On March 30, 2005, Johnson scored the game-winning goal in another qualifying match against Guatemala. He totaled seven goals in his first six World Cup qualifiers which placed him third on the U.S. all-time scoring list in World Cup qualifiers.

Johnson appeared in two matches at the 2006 FIFA World Cup and also participated in the 2007 Copa América as well the 2007 Gold Cup. In the U.S.'s opening Copa América match against Argentina he earned and then converted a penalty kick to put the United States ahead 1–0 in a game they eventually lost 4–1.

On May 11, 2010, Johnson was named to the United States pre-2010 FIFA World Cup roster; he was ultimately cut before the team traveled to South Africa.

Johnson returned to the U.S. team for the 2014 World Cup qualifiers against Antigua and Barbuda and Guatemala. He scored both goals in the 2–1 victory over Antigua and Barbuda, with the winner coming in the 90th minute. He also assisted on Clint Dempsey's game-winning goal versus Guatemala.

Johnson scored the second goal for the United States against Panama during the World Cup Qualifying match held in Seattle, Washington on June 11, 2013. The goal was scored at CenturyLink Field, the home stadium of his pro club, Seattle Sounders FC. Johnson said of the goal, "It's a dream come true. To play in the U.S. jersey, first of all, is an honor, but to play in front of my fans that I play in front of week in and week out, I couldn’t have asked for a better feeling after the goal tonight." Johnson also scored the game winner in the World Cup Qualifier against Mexico in Columbus which qualified the USMNT for Brazil 2014.

Post-playing Career
Johnson is currently working for his USSF A license and has coached younger Americans such as Christian Pulisic.

Personal life
Johnson became a Christian when he was 18. Johnson has spoken about his faith saying, "I began to think positively for the first time in years, and I became more patient. ... God showed me how to make the most of my life, both on and off the field. ... Through Jesus’ example, I have learned to forgive people and not hold grudges like I used to. That's the key to the rest of my life: faithfulness, both His and mine. I encourage you to make it the key to the rest of your life as well.

While growing up, Johnson considered Romário as his favorite player and watched him when he was nine-years-old and watched the 1994 World Cup in America. Johnson supports Manchester United.

Career statistics

Club

International

Honors
United States
CONCACAF Gold Cup: 2007, 2013

Individual
MLS Comeback Player of the Year: 2007, 2012
FIFA World Youth Championship Golden Boot: 2003

References

External links

 
 
 

1984 births
Living people
2006 FIFA World Cup players
2007 CONCACAF Gold Cup players
2007 Copa América players
2013 CONCACAF Gold Cup players
African-American Christians
African-American soccer players
American expatriate soccer players
American expatriate sportspeople in England
American soccer players
Aris Thessaloniki F.C. players
Association football forwards
Cardiff City F.C. players
CONCACAF Gold Cup-winning players
Converts to Christianity
D.C. United players
Designated Players (MLS)
English Football League players
Expatriate footballers in England
Expatriate footballers in Greece
Expatriate footballers in Wales
FC Dallas draft picks
FC Dallas players
Fulham F.C. players
Major League Soccer All-Stars
Major League Soccer players
People from Bunnell, Florida
Premier League players
Preston North End F.C. players
Seattle Sounders FC players
Soccer players from Florida
Sporting Kansas City players
Super League Greece players
United States men's international soccer players
United States men's under-20 international soccer players
United States men's under-23 international soccer players
United States men's youth international soccer players
21st-century African-American sportspeople
20th-century African-American people